The 2004 All-Ireland Senior Football Championship Final was the 117th All-Ireland Final and the deciding match of the 2004 All-Ireland Senior Football Championship, an inter-county Gaelic football tournament for the top teams in Ireland. 

Mayo were hoping to bridge a gap that stretched all the way back to their All-Ireland football title winning team of 1951. They failed, though less miserably than in 2006. Mayo lost their fourth final in a row; in the end Kerry only won by eight points. Dara Ó Cinnéide was the winning captain, while manager Jack O'Connor won the title in his first season in charge.
The match was shown live in Ireland on RTÉ2 as part of The Sunday Game with match commentary from Ger Canning and Martin Carney.

Largely regarded as one of the most disappointing All-Ireland football finals for many years, Mayo's capitulation drove spectators from the stadium in their thousands with Kerry leading by 1-12 to 1-4 at half time. Kerry racked up a total of 1-20, the highest team score in an All-Ireland football final since the time of 'Bomber' Liston and the 5-11 that decimated Dublin in 1978. Mayo returned to the final two years later, to be torn apart by Kerry all over again in a final when Kerry surpassed the score they achieved in 2004.

In 2022, Martin Breheny listed it among "five of the worst" All-Ireland SFC finals since 1972.

References:

References

External links
Match Highlights

All-Ireland Senior Football Championship Final
All-Ireland Senior Football Championship Final, 2004
All-Ireland Senior Football Championship Finals
All-Ireland Senior Football Championship Finals
Kerry county football team matches
Mayo county football team matches